gretl is an open-source statistical package, mainly for econometrics. The name is an acronym for Gnu Regression, Econometrics and Time-series Library.

It has both a graphical user interface (GUI) and a command-line interface. It is written in C, uses GTK+ as widget toolkit for creating its GUI, and calls gnuplot for generating graphs. The native scripting language of gretl is known as hansl (see below); it can also be used together with TRAMO/SEATS, R, Stata, Python, Octave, Ox and Julia.

It includes natively all the basic statistical techniques employed in contemporary Econometrics and Time-Series Analysis. Additional estimators and tests are available via user-contributed function packages, which are written in hansl.
gretl can output models as LaTeX files.

Besides English, gretl is also available in Albanian, Basque, Bulgarian, Catalan, Chinese, Czech, French, Galician, German, Greek, Italian, Polish, Portuguese (both varieties), Romanian, Russian, Spanish, Turkish and Ukrainian.

Gretl has been reviewed several times in the Journal of Applied Econometrics and, more recently, in the Australian Economic Review.

A review also appeared in the Journal of Statistical Software in 2008. Since then, the journal has featured several articles in which gretl is used to implement various statistical techniques.

Supported data formats 
gretl offers its own fully documented, XML-based data format.

It can also import ASCII, CSV, databank, EViews, Excel, Gnumeric, GNU Octave, JMulTi, OpenDocument spreadsheets, PcGive, RATS 4, SAS xport, SPSS, and Stata files. Since version 2020c, the GeoJSON and Shapefile formats are also supported, for thematic map creation.

It can export to Stata, GNU Octave, R, CSV, JMulTi, and PcGive file formats.

hansl 
Gretl has its own scripting language, called hansl (which is a recursive acronym for Hansl's A Neat Scripting Language).

Hansl is a Turing-complete, interpreted programming language, featuring loops, conditionals, user-defined functions and complex data structures. It can be considered a domain-specific language for econometrics. Like other scientifically oriented programming languages, such as MATLAB and Julia, matrices are supported natively as a primitive variable type.

A simple example of hansl:

Running the above code produces
A (2 x 2)

  1   2
  3   4

B (2 x 2)

    -2      1
   1.5   -0.5

C (2 x 2)

      1.0000       0.0000
  8.8818e-16       1.0000

Phi(-3) =   0.001
Phi(-2) =   0.023
Phi(-1) =   0.159
Phi( 0) =   0.500
Phi( 1) =   0.841
Phi( 2) =   0.977
Phi( 3) =   0.999

Random Number Generation 
Random Number Generation (RNG) in gretl has been examined and tested in Yalta & Schreiber (2012). The authors conclude  "Our results show that the RNG related procedures in gretl are implemented soundly and perform well in the three crush test suites of the TestU01".

Gretl as a teaching tool 

Due to its libre nature and the breadth of econometric techniques it contains, gretl is widely used for teaching econometrics, from the undergraduate level onwards. Datasets in gretl format are available for several popular textbooks.

The following is a list of textbooks that use gretl as their software of choice:

 Dougherty, Christopher Introduction to Econometrics (Oxford University Press)
 Kufel, Tadeusz Ekonometria (Wydawnictwo Naukowe PWN); in Polish (Russian version also available)

In addition, a free supplement to Hill, Griffiths and Lim Principles of Econometrics (Wiley) is available.

See also 

 Comparison of statistical packages
 R (programming language)

References

External links 
 
 GretlWeb
 Gretl User's Guide 
 Lee Adkins's Using gretl for Principles of Econometrics
 Gretl Command Reference 
 Gretl Conference. Berlin, 2015

Cross-platform free software
Cross-platform software
Econometrics software
Free econometrics software
Free multilingual software
Free plotting software
Free software programmed in C
Free statistical software
GNU Project software
Numerical analysis software for Linux
Numerical analysis software for macOS
Numerical analysis software for Windows
Numerical programming languages
Numerical software
Plotting software
Regression and curve fitting software
Science software that uses GTK
Statistical programming languages
Time series software